

Events

Pre-1600
309/310 – Pope Eusebius is banished by the Emperor Maxentius to Sicily, where he dies, possibly from a hunger strike.
 682 – Pope Leo II begins his pontificate.
 986 – Byzantine–Bulgarian wars: Battle of the Gates of Trajan: The Bulgarians under the Comitopuli Samuel and Aron defeat the Byzantine forces at the Gate of Trajan, with Byzantine Emperor Basil II barely escaping.
1186 – Georgenberg Pact: Ottokar IV, Duke of Styria and Leopold V, Duke of Austria sign a heritage agreement in which Ottokar gives his duchy to Leopold and to his son Frederick under the stipulation that Austria and Styria would henceforth remain undivided.
1386 – Karl Topia, the ruler of Princedom of Albania forges an alliance with the Republic of Venice, committing to participate in all wars of the Republic and receiving coastal protection against the Ottomans in return.
1424 – Hundred Years' War: Battle of Verneuil: An English force under John, Duke of Bedford defeats a larger French army under Jean II, Duke of Alençon, John Stewart, and Earl Archibald of Douglas.
1488 – Konrad Bitz, the Bishop of Turku, marks the date of his preface to Missale Aboense, the oldest known book of Finland.
1498 – Cesare Borgia, son of Pope Alexander VI, becomes the first person in history to resign the cardinalate; later that same day, King Louis XII of France names him Duke of Valentinois.
1549 – Battle of Sampford Courtenay: The Prayer Book Rebellion is quashed in England.
1560 – The Catholic Church is overthrown and Protestantism is established as the national religion in Scotland.
1585 – Eighty Years' War: Siege of Antwerp: Antwerp is captured by Spanish forces under Alexander Farnese, Duke of Parma, who orders Protestants to leave the city and as a result over half of the 100,000 inhabitants flee to the northern provinces.
  1585   – A first group of colonists sent by Sir Walter Raleigh under the charge of Ralph Lane lands in the New World to create Roanoke Colony on Roanoke Island, off the coast of present-day North Carolina.
1597 – Islands Voyage: Robert Devereux, 2nd Earl of Essex, and Sir Walter Raleigh set sail on an expedition to the Azores.

1601–1900
1668 – The magnitude 8.0 North Anatolia earthquake causes 8,000 deaths in northern Anatolia, Ottoman Empire.
1712 – Action of 17 August 1712 New Deep naval battle between Denmark and Sweden.
1717 – Austro-Turkish War of 1716–18: The month-long Siege of Belgrade ends with Prince Eugene of Savoy's Austrian troops capturing the city from the Ottoman Empire.
1723 – Ioan Giurgiu Patachi becomes Bishop of Făgăraș and is festively installed in his position at the St. Nicolas Cathedral in Făgăraș, after being formally confirmed earlier by Pope Clement XI.
1740 – Pope Benedict XIV, previously known as Prospero Lambertini, succeeds Clement XII as the 247th Pope.
1784 – Classical composer Luigi Boccherini receives a pay rise of 12,000 reals from his employer, the Infante Luis, Count of Chinchón.
1798 – The Vietnamese Catholics report a Marian apparition in Quảng Trị, an event which is called Our Lady of La Vang.
1807 – Robert Fulton's North River Steamboat leaves New York City for Albany, New York, on the Hudson River, inaugurating the first commercial steamboat service in the world.
1808 – The Finnish War: The Battle of Alavus is fought.
1827 – Dutch King William I and Pope Leo XII sign concord.
1836 – British parliament accepts registration of births, marriages and deaths.
1862 – American Indian Wars: The Dakota War of 1862 begins in Minnesota as Dakota warriors attack white settlements along the Minnesota River.
  1862   – American Civil War: Major General J. E. B. Stuart is assigned command of all the cavalry of the Confederate Army of Northern Virginia.
1863 – American Civil War: In Charleston, South Carolina, Union batteries and ships bombard Confederate-held Fort Sumter.
1864 – American Civil War: Battle of Gainesville: Confederate forces defeat Union troops near Gainesville, Florida.
1866 – The Grand Duchy of Baden announces its withdrawal from the German Confederation and signs a treaty of peace and alliance with Prussia.
1876 – Richard Wagner’s Götterdämmerung, the last opera in his Ring cycle, premieres at the Bayreuth Festspielhaus.
1883 – The first public performance of the Dominican Republic's national anthem, Himno Nacional.
1896 – Bridget Driscoll became the first recorded case of a pedestrian killed in a collision with a motor car in the United Kingdom.

1901–present
1914 – World War I: Battle of Stallupönen: The German army of General Hermann von François defeats the Russian force commanded by Paul von Rennenkampf near modern-day Nesterov, Russia.
1915 – Jewish American Leo Frank is lynched in Marietta, Georgia, USA after a 13-year-old girl is murdered.
1916 – World War I: Romania signs a secret treaty with the Entente Powers. According to the treaty, Romania agreed to join the war on the Allied side.
1918 – Bolshevik revolutionary leader Moisei Uritsky is assassinated.
1942 – World War II: U.S. Marines raid the Japanese-held Pacific island of Makin. 
1943 – World War II: The U.S. Eighth Air Force suffers the loss of 60 bombers on the Schweinfurt–Regensburg mission.
  1943   – World War II: The U.S. Seventh Army under General George S. Patton arrives in Messina, Italy, followed several hours later by the British 8th Army under Field Marshal Bernard Montgomery, thus completing the Allied conquest of Sicily.
  1943   – World War II: First Québec Conference of Winston Churchill, Franklin D. Roosevelt, and William Lyon Mackenzie King begins.
  1943   – World War II: The Royal Air Force begins Operation Hydra, the first air raid of the Operation Crossbow strategic bombing campaign against Germany's V-weapon program.
1945 – Sukarno and Mohammad Hatta proclaim the independence of Indonesia, igniting the Indonesian National Revolution against the Dutch Empire.
  1945   – The novella Animal Farm by George Orwell is first published.
  1945   – Evacuation of Manchukuo: At Talitzou by the Sino-Korean border, Puyi, then the Kangde Emperor of Manchukuo, formally renounces the imperial throne, dissolves the state, and cedes its territory to the Republic of China.
1947 – The Radcliffe Line, the border between the Dominions of India and Pakistan, is revealed.
1949 – The 6.7  Karlıova earthquake shakes eastern Turkey with a maximum Mercalli intensity of X (Extreme), leaving 320–450 dead.
1949 – Matsukawa derailment: Unknown saboteurs cause a passenger train to derail and overturn in Fukushima Prefecture, Japan, killing three crew members and igniting a political firestorm between the Japanese Communist Party and the government of Occupied Japan that will eventually lead to the Japanese Red Purge.
1953 – First meeting of Narcotics Anonymous takes place, in Southern California.
1955 – Hurricane Diane made landfall near Wilmington, North Carolina, and it went on to cause major floods and kill more than 184 people.
1958 – Pioneer 0, America's first attempt at lunar orbit, is launched using the first Thor-Able rocket and fails. Notable as one of the first attempted launches beyond Earth orbit by any country.
1959 – Quake Lake is formed by the magnitude 7.2 1959 Hebgen Lake earthquake near Hebgen Lake in Montana.
1962 – Peter Fechter is shot and bleeds to death while trying to cross the new Berlin Wall.
1969 – Category 5 Hurricane Camille hits the U.S. Gulf Coast, killing 256 and causing $1.42 billion in damage.
1970 – Venera program: Venera 7 launched. It will later become the first spacecraft to successfully transmit data from the surface of another planet (Venus).
1976 – A magnitude 7.9 earthquake hits off the coast of Mindanao, Philippines, triggering a destructive tsunami, killing between 5,000-8,000 people and leaving more than 90,000 homeless.
1977 – The Soviet icebreaker Arktika becomes the first surface ship to reach the North Pole.
1978 – Double Eagle II becomes first balloon to cross the Atlantic Ocean when it lands in Miserey, France near Paris, 137 hours after leaving Presque Isle, Maine.
1985 – The 1985–86 Hormel strike begins in Austin, Minnesota.
1988 – President of Pakistan Muhammad Zia-ul-Haq and U.S. Ambassador Arnold Raphel are killed in a plane crash.
1991 – Strathfield massacre: In Sydney, New South Wales, Australia, taxi driver Wade Frankum shoots seven people and injures six others before turning the gun on himself.
1998 – Lewinsky scandal: US President Bill Clinton admits in taped testimony that he had an "improper physical relationship" with White House intern Monica Lewinsky; later that same day he admits before the nation that he "misled people" about the relationship.
1999 – The 7.6  İzmit earthquake shakes northwestern Turkey with a maximum Mercalli intensity of IX (Violent), leaving 17,118–17,127 dead and 43,953–50,000 injured.
2004 – The National Assembly of Serbia unanimously adopts new state symbols for Serbia: Bože pravde becomes the new anthem and the coat of arms is adopted for the whole country.
2005 – The first forced evacuation of settlers, as part of Israeli disengagement from Gaza, starts.
  2005   – Over 500 bombs are set off by terrorists at 300 locations in 63 out of the 64 districts of Bangladesh.
2008 – American swimmer Michael Phelps becomes the first person to win eight gold medals at one Olympic Games.
2009 – An accident at the Sayano-Shushenskaya Dam in Khakassia, Russia, kills 75 and shuts down the hydroelectric power station, leading to widespread power failure in the local area.
2015 – A bomb explodes near the Erawan Shrine in Bangkok, Thailand, killing at least 19 people and injuring 123 others.
2017 – Barcelona attacks: A van is driven into pedestrians in La Rambla, killing 14 and injuring at least 100.
2019 – A bomb explodes at a wedding in Kabul killing 63 people and leaving 182 injured.

Births

Pre-1600
1153 – William IX, Count of Poitiers (d. 1156)
1465 – Philibert I, Duke of Savoy (d. 1482)
1473 – Richard of Shrewsbury, Duke of York (d. 1483)
1501 – Philipp II, Count of Hanau-Münzenberg (d. 1529)
1556 – Alexander Briant, English martyr and saint (d. 1581)
1578 – Francesco Albani, Italian painter (d. 1660)
  1578   – Johann, Prince of Hohenzollern-Sigmaringen, first prince of Hohenzollern-Sigmaringen (d. 1638)
1582 – John Matthew Rispoli, Maltese philosopher (d. 1639)
1586 – Johann Valentin Andrea, German theologian (d. 1654)

1601–1900
1603 – Lennart Torstensson, Swedish Field Marshal, Privy Councillour and Governor-General (d. 1651)
1629 – John III Sobieski, Polish–Lithuanian king (d. 1696)
1686 – Nicola Porpora, Italian composer and educator (d. 1768)
1753 – Josef Dobrovský, Bohemian philologist and historian (d. 1828)
1768 – Louis Desaix, French general (d. 1800)
1786 – Davy Crockett, American soldier and politician (d. 1836)
  1786   – Princess Victoria of Saxe-Coburg-Saalfeld (d. 1861)
1801 – Fredrika Bremer, Swedish writer and feminist (d. 1865) 
1828 – Jules Bernard Luys, French neurologist and physician (d. 1897)
1840 – Wilfrid Scawen Blunt, English poet and activist (d. 1922)
1845 – Henry Cadwalader Chapman, American physician and naturalist (d. 1909)
1849 – William Kidston, Scottish-Australian politician, 17th Premier of Queensland (d. 1919)
1863 – Gene Stratton-Porter, American author and photographer (d. 1924)
1865 – Julia Marlowe, English-American actress (d. 1950)
1866 – Mahbub Ali Khan, Asaf Jah VI, Indian 6th Nizam of Hyderabad (d. 1911)
1873 – John A. Sampson, American gynecologist and academic (d. 1946)
1877 – Ralph McKittrick, American golfer and tennis player (d. 1923)
1878 – Reggie Duff, Australian cricketer (d. 1911)
1880 – Percy Sherwell, South African cricketer and tennis player (d. 1948)
1887 – Charles I of Austria (d. 1922)
  1887   – Marcus Garvey, Jamaican journalist and activist, founded Black Star Line (d. 1940)
1888 – Monty Woolley, American actor, raconteur, and pundit (d. 1963)
1890 – Stefan Bastyr, Polish soldier and pilot (d. 1920)
  1890   – Harry Hopkins, American politician and diplomat, 8th United States Secretary of Commerce (d. 1946)
1893 – John Brahm, German-American director and production manager (d. 1982)
  1893   – Mae West, American stage and film actress (d. 1980)
1894 – William Rootes, 1st Baron Rootes, English businessman, founded Rootes Group (d. 1964)
1896 – Leslie Groves, American general and engineer (d. 1970)
  1896   – Tõnis Kint, Estonian lieutenant and politician, Prime Minister of Estonia in exile (d. 1991)
  1896   – Oliver Waterman Larkin, American historian and author (d. 1970)
1900 – Vivienne de Watteville, British travel writer and adventurer (d. 1957)
  1900   – Pauline A. Young, American teacher, historian, aviator and activist (d. 1991)

1901–present
1904 – Mary Cain, American journalist and politician (d. 1984)
  1904   – Leopold Nowak, Austrian composer and musicologist (d. 1991)
1909 – Larry Clinton, American trumpet player and bandleader (d. 1985)
  1909   – Wilf Copping, English footballer (d. 1980)
1911 – Mikhail Botvinnik, Russian chess player and engineer (d. 1995)
  1911   – Martin Sandberger, German colonel and lawyer (d. 2010)
1913 – Mark Felt (aka 'Deep Throat'), American lawyer and agent, 2nd Deputy Director of the Federal Bureau of Investigation (d. 2008)
  1913   – Oscar Alfredo Gálvez, Argentinian race car driver (d. 1989)
  1913   – Rudy York, American baseball player and manager (d. 1970)
1914 – Bill Downs, American journalist (d. 1978)
  1914   – Franklin Delano Roosevelt Jr., American lawyer and politician (d. 1988)
1916 – Moses Majekodunmi, Nigerian physician and politician (d. 2012)
1918 – Evelyn Ankers, British-American actress (d. 1985)
  1918   – Ike Quebec, American saxophonist and pianist (d. 1963)
  1918   – Michael John Wise, English geographer and academic (d. 2015)
1919 – Georgia Gibbs, American singer (d. 2006)
1920 – Maureen O'Hara, Irish-American actress and singer (d. 2015)
  1920   – Lida Moser, American photographer and author (d. 2014)
1921 – Geoffrey Elton, German-English historian and academic (d. 1994)
1922 – Roy Tattersall, English cricketer (d. 2011)
1923 – Carlos Cruz-Diez, Venezuelan artist (d. 2019)
  1923   – Larry Rivers, American painter and sculptor (d. 2002)
1924 – Evan S. Connell, American novelist, poet, and short story writer (d. 2013)
1926 – Valerie Eliot, English businesswoman (d. 2012)
1926   – Jiang Zemin, Chinese engineer and politician, former General Secretary of the Chinese Communist Party (paramount leader) and 5th President of China (d. 2022)
1927 – Sam Butera, American saxophonist and bandleader (d. 2009)
  1927   – F. Ray Keyser Jr., American lawyer and politician, 72nd Governor of Vermont (d. 2015)
1928 – T. J. Anderson, American composer, conductor, and educator
  1928   – Willem Duys, Dutch tennis player, sportscaster, and producer (d. 2011)
1929 – Francis Gary Powers, American captain and pilot (d. 1977)
1930 – Harve Bennett, American screenwriter and producer (d. 2015)
  1930   – Ted Hughes, English poet and playwright (d. 1998)
1931 – Tony Wrigley, English historian, demographer, and academic (d. 2022)
1932 – V. S. Naipaul, Trinidadian-English novelist and essayist, Nobel Prize laureate (d. 2018)
  1932   – Duke Pearson, American pianist and composer (d. 1980)
  1932   – Jean-Jacques Sempé, French cartoonist (d. 2022)
1933 – Mark Dinning, American pop singer (d. 1986)
1934 – João Donato, Brazilian pianist and composer
  1934   – Ron Henry, English footballer (d. 2014)
1936 – Seamus Mallon, Irish educator and politician, Deputy First Minister of Northern Ireland (d. 2020)
  1936   – Margaret Heafield Hamilton, American computer scientist, systems engineer, and business owner.
1938 – Theodoros Pangalos, Greek lawyer and politician, Deputy Prime Minister of Greece
1939 – Luther Allison, American blues guitarist and singer (d. 1997)
1940 – Eduardo Mignogna, Argentinian director and screenwriter (d. 2006)
  1940   – Barry Sheerman, English academic and politician
1941 – Lothar Bisky, German businessman and politician (d. 2013)
  1941   – Jean Pierre Lefebvre, Canadian director and screenwriter
1942 – Shane Porteous, Australian actor, animator, and screenwriter
1943 – Edward Cowie, English composer, painter, and author
  1943   – Robert De Niro, American actor, entrepreneur, director, and producer
  1943   – John Humphrys, Welsh journalist and author
  1943   – Dave "Snaker" Ray, American singer-songwriter and guitarist (d. 2002)
1944 – Larry Ellison, American businessman, co-founded the Oracle Corporation
  1944   – Jean-Bernard Pommier, French pianist and conductor
1945 – Rachel Pollack, American author, poet, and educator
1946 – Hugh Baiocchi, South African golfer
  1946   – Martha Coolidge, American director, producer, and screenwriter
  1946   – Patrick Manning, Trinidadian-Tobagonian politician, 4th Prime Minister of Trinidad and Tobago (d. 2016)
1947 – Mohamed Abdelaziz, President of the Sahrawi Arab Democratic Republic (d. 2016)
  1947   – Gary Talley, American guitarist, singer-songwriter, and author 
1948 – Alexander Ivashkin, Russian-English cellist and conductor (d. 2014)
1949 – Norm Coleman, American lawyer and politician, 52nd Mayor of St. Paul
  1949   – Sue Draheim, American fiddler and composer (d. 2013)
  1949   – Julian Fellowes, English actor, director, screenwriter, and politician
  1949   – Sib Hashian, American rock drummer (d. 2017)
1951 – Richard Hunt, American Muppet performer (d. 1992) 
1952 – Aleksandr Maksimenkov, Russian footballer and coach (d. 2012)
  1952   – Nelson Piquet, Brazilian race car driver and businessman
  1952   – Mario Theissen, German engineer and businessman
  1952   – Guillermo Vilas, Argentinian tennis player
1953 – Mick Malthouse, Australian footballer and coach
  1953   – Herta Müller, Romanian-German poet and author, Nobel Prize laureate
  1953   – Korrie Layun Rampan, Indonesian author, poet, and critic (d. 2015)
  1953   – Kevin Rowland, English singer-songwriter and guitarist 
1954 – Eric Johnson, American singer-songwriter, guitarist, and producer
  1954   – Andrés Pastrana Arango, Colombian lawyer and politician, 38th President of Colombia
1955 – Colin Moulding, English singer-songwriter and bassist 
1956 – Gail Berman, American businessman, co-founded BermanBraun
  1956   – Álvaro Pino, Spanish cyclist
1957 – Ken Kwapis, American director and screenwriter
  1957   – Laurence Overmire, American poet, author, and actor
  1957   – Robin Cousins, British competitive figure skater 
1958 – Belinda Carlisle, American singer-songwriter 
  1958   – Fred Goodwin, Scottish banker and accountant
  1958   – Maurizio Sandro Sala, Brazilian race car driver
1959 – Jonathan Franzen, American novelist and essayist
  1959   – Jacek Kazimierski, Polish footballer
  1959   – Eric Schlosser, American journalist and author
  1959   – David Koresh, American cult leader 
1960 – Stephan Eicher, Swiss singer-songwriter 
  1960   – Sean Penn, American actor, director, and political activist
1962 – Gilby Clarke, American singer-songwriter, guitarist, and producer 
  1962   – Dan Dakich, American basketball player, coach, and sportscaster
1963 – Jon Gruden, American football player, coach, and sportscaster
  1963 – Jackie Walorski, American politician (d. 2022) 
1964 – Colin James, Canadian singer-songwriter, guitarist, and producer
  1964   – Maria McKee, American singer-songwriter
  1964   – Dave Penney, English footballer and manager
1965 – Steve Gorman, American drummer 
  1965   – Dottie Pepper, American golfer
1966 – Jüri Luik, Estonian politician and diplomat, 18th Estonian Minister of Defense
  1966   – Rodney Mullen, American skateboarder and stuntman
  1966   – Don Sweeney, Canadian ice hockey player and manager
1967 – Michael Preetz, German footballer and manager
1968 – Andriy Kuzmenko, Ukrainian singer-songwriter (d. 2015)
  1968   – Ed McCaffrey, American football player and sportscaster
  1968   – Helen McCrory, English actress (d. 2021)
1969 – Christian Laettner, American basketball player and coach
  1969   – Donnie Wahlberg, American singer-songwriter, actor and producer
  1969   – Kelvin Mercer, American rapper, songwriter and producer
1970 – Jim Courier, American tennis player and sportscaster
  1970   – Andrus Kivirähk, Estonian author
  1970   – Øyvind Leonhardsen, Norwegian footballer and coach
1971 – Uhm Jung-hwa, South Korean singer and actress
  1971   – Jorge Posada, Puerto Rican-American baseball player
  1971   – Shaun Rehn, Australian footballer and coach
1972 – Habibul Bashar, Bangladeshi cricketer
1974 – Johannes Maria Staud, Austrian composer
1976 – Eric Boulton, Canadian ice hockey player
  1976   – Geertjan Lassche, Dutch journalist and director
  1976   – Serhiy Zakarlyuka, Ukrainian footballer and manager (d. 2014)
1977 – Nathan Deakes, Australian race walker
  1977   – William Gallas, French footballer
  1977   – Thierry Henry, French footballer
  1977   – Mike Lewis, Welsh guitarist 
  1977   – Tarja Turunen, Finnish singer-songwriter and producer 
1979 – Antwaan Randle El, American football player and journalist
1980 – Keith Dabengwa, Zimbabwean cricketer
  1980   – Daniel Güiza, Spanish footballer
  1980   – Jan Kromkamp, Dutch footballer
  1980   – Lene Marlin, Norwegian singer-songwriter
1982 – Phil Jagielka, English footballer
  1982   – Cheerleader Melissa, American wrestler and manager
  1982   – Mark Salling, American actor and musician (d. 2018)
1983 – Dustin Pedroia, American baseball player
1984 – Dee Brown, American basketball player
  1984   – Oksana Domnina, Russian ice dancer
  1984   – Liam Heath, British sprint canoeist
  1984   – Garrett Wolfe, American football player
1985 – Yū Aoi, Japanese actress and model
1986 – Rudy Gay, American basketball player
  1986   – Tyrus Thomas, American basketball player
1988 – Natalie Sandtorv, Norwegian singer-songwriter 
  1988   – Jihadi John, Kuwaiti-British member of ISIS (d. 2015)
  1988   – Erika Toda, Japanese actress
1989 – Rachel Corsie, Scottish footballer
1992 – Alex Elisala, New Zealand-Australian rugby player (d. 2013)
  1992   – Chanel Mata'utia, Australian rugby league player 
  1992   – Paige, English wrestler
1993 – Ederson Moraes, Brazilian footballer
  1993   – Cinta Laura, German actress and singer
  1993   – Sarah Sjöström, Swedish swimmer
  1993   – Xie Zhenye, Chinese athlete
1994 – Phoebe Bridgers, American singer/songwriter
1995 – Gracie Gold, American figure skater
  1995   – Dallin Watene-Zelezniak, New Zealand rugby league player
1996 – Jake Virtanen, Canadian ice hockey player 
2000 – Lil Pump, American rapper and songwriter
2003 – Nastasja Schunk, German tennis player

Deaths

Pre-1600
 754 – Carloman, mayor of the palace of Austrasia
 949 – Li Shouzhen, Chinese general and governor
1153 – Eustace IV, Count of Boulogne (b. 1130)
1304 – Emperor Go-Fukakusa of Japan (b. 1243)
1324 – Irene of Brunswick (b. 1293)
1338 – Nitta Yoshisada, Japanese samurai (b. 1301)
1424 – John Stewart, Earl of Buchan (b. c. 1381)
1510 – Edmund Dudley, English politician, Speaker of the House of Commons (b. 1462)
  1510   – Richard Empson, English statesman
1547 – Katharina von Zimmern, Swiss sovereign abbess (b. 1478)

1601–1900
1673 – Regnier de Graaf, Dutch physician and anatomist (b. 1641)
1676 – Hans Jakob Christoffel von Grimmelshausen, German author (b. 1621)
1720 – Anne Dacier, French scholar and translator (b. 1654)
1723 – Joseph Bingham, English scholar and academic (b. 1668)
1768 – Vasily Trediakovsky, Russian poet and playwright (b. 1703)
1785 – Jonathan Trumbull, English-American merchant and politician, 16th Governor of Connecticut (b. 1710)
1786 – Frederick the Great, Prussian king (b. 1712)
1809 – Matthew Boulton, English businessman and engineer, co-founded Boulton and Watt (b. 1728)
1814 – John Johnson, English architect and surveyor (b. 1732)
1834 – Husein Gradaščević, Ottoman general (b. 1802)
1838 – Lorenzo Da Ponte, Italian playwright and poet (b. 1749)
1850 – José de San Martín, Argentinian general and politician, 1st President of Peru (b. 1778)
1861 – Alcée Louis la Branche, American politician and diplomat, 1st United States Ambassador to Texas (b. 1806)
1870 – Perucho Figueredo, Cuban poet and activist (b. 1818)
1875 – Wilhelm Bleek, German linguist and anthropologist (b. 1827)
1897 – William Jervois, English engineer and diplomat, 10th Governor of South Australia (b. 1821)

1901–present
1901 – Edmond Audran, French organist and composer (b. 1842)
1903 – Hans Gude, Norwegian-German painter and academic (b. 1825)
1908 – Radoje Domanović, Serbian satirist and journalist (b. 1873)
1909 – Madan Lal Dhingra, Indian activist (b. 1883)
1918 – Moisei Uritsky, Russian activist and politician (b. 1873)
1920 – Ray Chapman, American baseball player (b. 1891)
1924 – Tom Kendall, English-Australian cricketer and journalist (b. 1851)
1925 – Ioan Slavici, Romanian journalist and author (b. 1848)
1935 – Adam Gunn, American decathlete (b. 1872)
  1935   – Charlotte Perkins Gilman, American sociologist and author (b. 1860)
1936 – José María of Manila, Spanish-Filipino priest and martyr (b. 1880)
1940 – Billy Fiske, American soldier and pilot (b. 1911)
1945 – Reidar Haaland, Norwegian police officer and soldier (b. 1919)
1949 – Gregorio Perfecto, Filipino journalist, jurist, and politician (b. 1891)
1958 – Arthur Fox, English-American fencer (b. 1878)
1966 – Ken Miles, English race car driver and engineer (b. 1918)
1969 – Otto Stern, German physicist and academic, Nobel Prize laureate (b. 1888)
1970 – Rattana Pestonji, Thai director and producer (b. 1908)
1971 – Maedayama Eigorō, Japanese sumo wrestler, the 39th Yokozuna (b. 1914)
  1971   – Wilhelm List, German field marshal (b. 1880)
1973 – Conrad Aiken, American novelist, short story writer, critic, and poet (b. 1889)
  1973   – Jean Barraqué, French pianist and composer (b. 1928)
  1973   – Paul Williams, American singer and choreographer (b. 1939)
1977 – Delmer Daves, American screenwriter, director and producer (b. 1904)
1979 – John C. Allen, American roller coaster designer (b. 1907)
  1979   – Vivian Vance, American actress and singer (b. 1909)
1983 – Ira Gershwin, American songwriter (b. 1896)
1987 – Gary Chester, Italian drummer and educator (b. 1924)
  1987   – Rudolf Hess, German soldier and politician (b. 1894)
  1987   – Shaike Ophir, Israeli actor and screenwriter (b. 1929)
1988 – Muhammad Zia-ul-Haq, Pakistani general and politician, 6th President of Pakistan (b. 1924)
  1988   – Franklin Delano Roosevelt Jr., American lawyer and politician (b. 1914)
  1988   – Victoria Shaw, Australian-American actress (b. 1935)
1990 – Pearl Bailey, American actress and singer (b. 1918)
1993 – Feng Kang, Chinese mathematician and academic (b. 1920)
1994 – Luigi Chinetti, Italian-American race car driver and businessman (b. 1901)
  1994   – Jack Sharkey, American boxer and referee (b. 1902)
1995 – Howard E. Koch, American playwright and screenwriter (b. 1902)
  1995   – Ted Whitten, Australian footballer and coach (b. 1933)
1998 – Władysław Komar, Polish shot putter and actor (b. 1940)
  1998   – Tadeusz Ślusarski, Polish pole vaulter (b. 1950)
2000 – Jack Walker, English businessman (b. 1929)
2004 – Thea Astley, Australian author and educator (b. 1925)
2005 – John N. Bahcall, American astrophysicist and academic (b. 1934)
2006 – Shamsur Rahman, Bangladeshi poet and journalist (b. 1929)
2007 – Bill Deedes, English journalist and politician (b. 1913)
  2007   – Eddie Griffin, American basketball player (b. 1982)
2008 – Franco Sensi, Italian businessman and politician (b. 1926)
2010 – Francesco Cossiga, Italian lawyer and politician, 8th President of Italy (b. 1928)
2012 – Aase Bjerkholt, Norwegian politician, Minister of Children, Equality and Social Inclusion (b. 1915)
  2012   – Victor Poor, American engineer, developed the Datapoint 2200 (b. 1933)
  2012   – Patrick Ricard, French businessman (b. 1945)
  2012   – John Lynch-Staunton, Canadian lawyer and politician (b. 1930)
2013 – Odilia Dank, American educator and politician (b. 1938)
  2013   – Jack Harshman, American baseball player (b. 1927)
  2013   – John Hollander, American poet and critic (b. 1929)
  2013   – Frank Martínez, American painter (b. 1924)
  2013   – Gus Winckel, Dutch lieutenant and pilot (b. 1912)
2014 – Børre Knudsen, Norwegian minister and activist (b. 1937)
  2014   – Wolfgang Leonhard, German historian and author (b. 1921)
  2014   – Sophie Masloff, American civil servant and politician, 56th Mayor of Pittsburgh (b. 1917)
  2014   – Miodrag Pavlović, Serbian poet and critic (b. 1928)
  2014   – Pierre Vassiliu, French singer-songwriter (b. 1937)
2015 – Yvonne Craig, American ballet dancer and actress (b. 1937)
  2015   – Gerhard Mayer-Vorfelder, German businessman (b. 1933)
  2015   – László Paskai, Hungarian cardinal (b. 1927)
2016 – Arthur Hiller, Canadian actor, director, and producer (b. 1923)

Holidays and observances
Christian feast day:
Clare of Montefalco
Hyacinth of Poland
Jeanne Delanoue 
Samuel Johnson, Timothy Cutler, and Thomas Bradbury Chandler (Episcopal Church)
August 17 (Eastern Orthodox liturgics)
Engineer's Day (Colombia)
Flag Day (Bolivia)
Independence Day, celebrates the independence proclamation of Indonesia from Japan in 1945.
Independence Day, celebrates the independence of Gabon from France in 1960.
Marcus Garvey Day (Jamaica)
Prekmurje Union Day (Slovenia)
San Martin Day (Argentina)
Black Cat Appreciation Day (United States)

References

External links

 
 
 

Days of the year
August